Dragoș Bucur (born 13 June 1977) is a Romanian actor, ambassador for the program Youth of the Move involved by the European Commission, and TV presenter for the show Visuri la cheie broadcast on Pro TV Visuri la cheie.

Dragoș Bucur received the Shooting Stars Award, the annual acting award for up-and-coming actors by European Film Promotion, at the Berlin International Film Festival 2010.

He holds an acting degree from Caragiale Academy of Theatrical Arts and Cinematography in Bucharest, Romania. He became known through his roles in Police, Adjective praised by The Washington Post, "The Way Back", or "Boogie", The Guardian notes about Dragoș character: "Dragoș plays  Bogdan or 'Boogie', a hardworking guy who has been prevailed upon to take his partner Smaranda (Anamaria Marinca) and their child to the seaside." Also he stars in "The Paper Will Be Blue" and many more productions.

Apart from being an actor he has also hosted several Romanian TV shows like Jurnal de călătorie, Faci Pariu?, Marfă, Câștigi fără să știi, etc.

Awards and honours 

For his acting talent he has received many awards in the recent years. In 2002 and 2009 he won the UCIN award for Best Actor for the films The Rage and Boogie, while in 2009 and 2010 he won the GOPO award for Best Actor again for Boogie and Police, he also received the Actor Award at Buenos Aires Intl. Festival of Independent Film (BAFICI) writes Variety.

He currently resides in Bucharest, Romania, together with his wife, Romanian singer Dana Nălbaru and their daughter Sofia, who was born in 2007. In March 2010, Dragos Bucur, Dorian Boguţă and Alexandru Papadopol founded Actoriedefilm.ro - acting school and production company.

Filmography

Film

Television

References

External links
 Dragoș Bucur at www.shooting-stars.eu
 

1977 births
Living people
Romanian male film actors
Male actors from Bucharest
Romanian male television actors
20th-century Romanian male actors
21st-century Romanian male actors
Caragiale National University of Theatre and Film alumni
Television people from Bucharest